Grand Crew is an American television sitcom created by Phil Augusta Jackson, that premiered on NBC on December 14, 2021, with two "sneak episodes". In May 2022, the series was renewed for a second season which premiered on March 3, 2023.

Cast and characters

Main
 Echo Kellum as Noah Koles, a hopeless romantic that thinks his life is a rom-com and Nicky's brother
 Nicole Byer as Nicky Koles, a realtor and Noah's sister
 Justin Cunningham as Wyatt Fields, the married friend
 Aaron Jennings as Anthony Holmes, an accountant, vegan, and Sherm's roommate
 Carl Tart as Sherm Jones, a journeyman and Anthony's roommate
 Grasie Mercedes as Fay, new to the crew and recently divorced, works at the crew's hangout

Recurring
 Maya Lynne Robinson as Kristen Fields, Wyatt's wife
 Ashleigh Morghan as Simone, Noah's girlfriend who needs to get married or she will be deported
 Colton Dunn as Michael, Wyatt's Brother who dates Nicky
 Ashley Blaine Featherson-Jenkins as Talia, Anthony's girlfriend

Guest
 Garrett Morris as Narrator ("Pilot")
 Alim Kouliev as Oleg ("Wine & Pie")

Episodes

Season 1 (2021–22)

Season 2 (2023)

Production

Development
On January 23, 2020, it was given a pilot order by NBC. The pilot was directed by Mo Marable and written by Phil Augusta Jackson who was expected to executive produce along with Dan Goor. Production companies involved with the series include Universal Television. On January 12, 2021, it was announced that NBC had ordered the series. On May 12, 2022, NBC renewed the series for a second season which premiered on March 3, 2023.

Casting
In March 2020, Deadline reported Justin Cunningham had joined the cast as Wyatt Fields, Echo Kellum joined the cast as Noah Koles, and Carl Tart joined the cast as Sherm Jones, then later Nicole Byer joined the cast as Nicky and Aaron Jennings joined the cast as Anthony Holmes. On August 17, 2021, Grasie Mercedes has joined the cast as Fay.

Broadcast
The series premiered on December 14, 2021, at 8 p.m., with two "sneak episodes" before returning on January 4, 2022 in its regular time slot, 8:30 p.m. on Tuesdays.

Reception

Critical response
The review aggregator website Rotten Tomatoes reported a 80% approval rating with an average rating of 8/10, based on 10 critic reviews. The website's critics consensus reads, "Grand Crew doesn't immediately find its comedic footing, but this cast of friends—especially the effervescent Nicole Byer—are promising company." Metacritic, which uses a weighted average, assigned a score of 63 out of 100 based on 8 critics, indicating "generally favorable reviews".

Ratings

Season 1

Season 2

References

External links

2020s American black sitcoms
2020s American single-camera sitcoms
2021 American television series debuts
English-language television shows
NBC original programming
Television series by Universal Television
Television shows set in Los Angeles